The Root of All Evil is a studio album by Swedish melodic death metal band Arch Enemy, featuring re-recorded songs from the first three albums by the band—Black Earth (tracks 1, 6, 8, 10, 11), Stigmata (tracks 2, 4, 13), and Burning Bridges (tracks 3, 5, 7, 9, 12). It was released on 28 September 2009 by Century Media Records and was made available as a jewel case CD, limited edition mediabook, digital media download and LP. The album was produced by the band themselves and mixed and mastered by Andy Sneap. All songs from this album are re-recordings, with the title track being another version of the instrumental Demoniality.

Track listing

Limited edition bonus tracks

Japan bonus tracks 
The Japanese release of the album includes the above-mentioned live tracks plus an additional two tracks.

Release dates 
 Germany / Austria / Switzerland / Italy / Benelux: 25 September 2009
 UK / France / Greece / Denmark / Norway / Rest of Europe: 28 September 2009
 Spain / Portugal: 29 September 2009
 Finland / Sweden / Hungary / Japan: 30 September 2009
 United States: 6 October 2009

Charts

Credits

Band members 
Angela Gossow – vocals
Michael Amott – guitar and backing vocals
Christopher Amott – guitar
Sharlee D'Angelo – bass
Daniel Erlandsson – drums

Production 
 Arch Enemy – production
 Andy Sneap – mixing and mastering
 Daniel Erlandsson – recording
 Rickard Bengtsson – recording
 Gustavo Sazes – artwork/layout

References

External links 
 The Root of All Evil at Encyclopaedia Metallum
 Gustavo Sazes official site
 Andy Sneap recording studio

2009 compilation albums
2009 remix albums
Arch Enemy albums
Century Media Records albums